The Lustful Vicar is a 1970 Swedish comedy film directed by Torgny Wickman and starring Jarl Borssén. It was released to cinemas in Sweden on 30 March 1970.

Cast
 Jarl Borssén – The vicar
 Margit Carlqvist – Mother Sibyll
 Magali Noël – Countess
 Diana Kjær – Sanna
 Solveig Andersson – Anita
 John Elfström – Parish clerk and organist
 Dirch Passer – Bartolomeus
 Håkan Westergren – The Bishop
 Åke Fridell – Mr. Paular
 Lissi Alandh – Mrs. Paular
 Arne Källerud – The Mailman
 Christer Söderlund – Soldier
 Anne Grete Nissen – Barbro, the evil witch
 Kim Anderzon – Agneta
 Louise Tillberg – Sylfidia
 Mona Månsson Ivarson – Berlack
 Suzanne Hovinder – Alma
 Cornelis Vreeswijk – Troubadour
 Inger Öjebro – Dagmar
 Karin Miller – Anna
 Cleo Boman – Greta
 Berit Hindersson – Ingeborg
 Bibi Nilsson – Birgit
 Emma Wickman – Young messenger
 Maud Hyttenberg – Cook
 Louis Miehe-Renard – Antonio, professor
 Tor Isedal – Obliquely man with a warped wig
 Ewert Granholm – Magister

References

External links

1970 films
1970 comedy films
1970s Swedish-language films
Swedish comedy films
1970s Swedish films